Shokhrukh Abdulazizov is a taekwondo fighter from Uzbekistan.

He competed in the 2009 Asian Championships in Kish Island and the 2010 World Taekwondo Junior Championships in Tijuana. In the latter competition he made it to the quarter finals where he lost to the Croatian athlete Tin Solenicki.

In 2012, he finished third in the men's featherweight class at the 7th Korea Open International Taekwondo Championships.

References

Living people
Uzbekistani male taekwondo practitioners
Place of birth missing (living people)
Year of birth missing (living people)
21st-century Uzbekistani people